Steven Bradford Culp (born December 3, 1955) is an American actor. Culp appeared in films Jason Goes to Hell: The Final Friday (1993), James and the Giant Peach (1996), The Emperor's Club (2002), and most notably in the 2000 political thriller Thirteen Days playing Robert F. Kennedy. 

On television, Culp had recurring roles as Clayton Webb in the CBS procedural JAG (1997–2004), and Speaker of the United States House of Representatives Jeff Haffley in the NBC political drama The West Wing (2003–2005). He also appeared as Rex Van de Kamp in the ABC comedy-drama series, Desperate Housewives.

He also appeared in How to Get Away with Murder as defense attorney Victor Leshner.

Early life and education
Culp was born in La Jolla, California, the son of Mary Ann Joseph (Born. Coshocton, Ohio), and Joseph Franklin Culp (Born. Dallas). Both his father and stepfather were in the United States Navy. He attended First Colonial High School in Virginia Beach, Virginia. He graduated from the College of William and Mary in 1978 with a major in English literature and also studied at the University of Exeter in the United Kingdom. He earned an M.F.A. from Brandeis University in 1981.

Career
One of Culp's earliest roles was in Jason Goes to Hell: The Final Friday (1993) as Robert Campbell, a reporter looking into the Jason murders. He also played the father of the titular character in James and the Giant Peach. In 1995, Culp briefly starred on The Young and the Restless as Brian Hamilton. Culp is known for his recurring roles as CIA Agent Clayton Webb on JAG (1997–2004) and Major Hayes on Star Trek: Enterprise (2003–2004). His characters in both series were killed in the same week in the shows' season finales, although Culp’s character in JAG reappeared in the series’ subsequent season premiere. In 2003, Culp appeared in a few episodes of the second season of 24 as Secret Service agent Ted Simmons. He had a recurring role in the NBC series The West Wing as Republican Speaker of the House of Representatives Jeff Haffley from 2003 to 2005.

Culp portrayed Robert F. Kennedy twice, in the HBO movie Norma Jean & Marilyn (1996) and the film Thirteen Days (2000). He played Commander Martin Madden in Star Trek: Nemesis (2002), a character written to replace William Riker as first officer of the Enterprise. However, due to the film's length, Culp's scenes were included in several cut from the final film. His scenes as Madden can be seen in the Nemesis DVD deleted scenes. In the third season of Star Trek: Enterprise, Culp played the recurring character Major Hayes, leader of the M.A.C.O.s. He was in five episodes; "The Xindi", "The Shipment", "Harbinger", "Hatchery" and "Countdown", where Hayes was shot saving a fellow crewmember. Other performances include playing the leading role of the photographer Richard Stewart in the English as a Second Language educational video series Family Album, U.S.A. He also had a role as antagonist Peter Drummond in the television movie How to Make a Monster, in which computer game programmers accidentally give life to a deadly AI and members of a software company attempt to beat the game to save their lives. 

From 2004 to 2005, Culp played Rex Van de Kamp on the ABC comedy-drama series Desperate Housewives for one season. His character was killed at the end of the season, although Culp reprised his role several times in flashback sequences and as narrator in one season 3 episode. In 2007, he was a regular cast member in the ABC short-lived series Traveler as Special Agent in Charge Fred Chambers. The following years, Culp guest-starred on number of shows, including NCIS, The Closer, Criminal Minds, Body of Proof, How to Get Away with Murder, Dynasty, American Horror Story: 1984 and 9-1-1. He starred as Thomas Foran in the 2010 film The Chicago 8. Culp had a recurring roles as Dr. Darren Parker on Grey's Anatomy in 2012, and from 2013 to 2014 in the NBC series Revolution as Edward Truman. From 2015 to 2018, he had a recurring role in the Amazon prime crime drama Bosch.

Personal life
He is married to Barbara Ayers, and they have two children together. He had two half-sisters, Shelly Grabinsky and Kathryn Harvey. On January 1, 2006, Kathryn was murdered in Richmond, Virginia, along with her husband, Bryan, and their two daughters, Stella and Ruby.

Filmography

Film

Television

References

External links
 
 

1955 births
Male actors from California
Alumni of the University of Exeter
American male film actors
American male television actors
Brandeis University alumni
College of William & Mary alumni
Living people
People from La Jolla, San Diego
20th-century American male actors
21st-century American male actors